The Interamerican University Studies Institute (IUSI) transferred its principal programs to the Oregon University System's International Office in 2009, and shut down its operations the following year. For information regarding the current programs, see https://web.archive.org/web/20121015063619/http://oia.pdx.edu/ea/

The Interamerican University Studies Institute (IUSI) fosters educational and cultural exchange between the U.S. and Latin America to address the need for better understanding among the peoples of the Americas. Over the past 21 years, IUSI has sponsored more than 2,000 US citizens in the city of Querétaro, Mexico, and in Costa Rica. The institute has conducted successful programs with Dartmouth, Middlebury and Westmont Colleges; the Universities of Oregon, Mississippi, Northern Arizona, and Mary Hardin-Baylor; and the Catholic University of America. Primary institutional partners in Querétaro include the Universidad Autónoma de Querétaro (UAQ is the state university); the Queretaro Museum of Art, and the Centro de Educación Artística (CEDART) an arts-based public high school under the national Instituto de Bellas Artes. The goal of IUSI’s programs is to promote high-quality academic learning and cross-cultural  integration between US and Latin American peoples. IUSI's board of directors includes Alicia Andreu, Araceli Ardón, David Curland, Juan Armando Epple, Robert M. Jackson and Fernando de Necochea,

Since 1985, IUSI has provided intensive Spanish language and cultural immersion programs for undergraduate and graduate level college students. As well, IUSI administers two high school programs for exceptional youth, Artes en Mexico and ¡Pura Vida!, an intensive field biology program in the Costa Rican rain forest. IUSI sponsors the participation of Mexican high school students in a summer jazz music camp in Oregon. It holds a binational workshop in literary translation for Mexican and US participants, now in its ninth year. In collaboration with the University of Oregon it will offer a new graduate seminar in Mexican literature and language. 

Participants are recruited nationally; courses run from one week to a full college semester. 

Study abroad programs
Organizations established in 1985
1985 establishments in the United States